Saint Charles River is a  tributary of the Arkansas River that flows from a source near Saint Charles Peak in the Wet Mountains of southern Colorado.  It joins the Arkansas east of Pueblo, Colorado.

See also
List of rivers of Colorado

References

Rivers of Colorado
Tributaries of the Arkansas River
Rivers of Custer County, Colorado
Rivers of Pueblo County, Colorado